Oxycanus perditus is a moth of the family Hepialidae. It is found in Western Australia.

References

Moths described in 1935
Hepialidae
Endemic fauna of Australia